Friends2Support.org is the world's largest voluntary blood donors online platform and a non-profit organization providing access to contact blood donors online from its website and mobile applications. Friends2Support (F2S) has over 400,000 people voluntarily registered as blood donors.

Founding 
Five friends; Shaik Shareef, Naveen Reddy, Eswar S, Phani Kethamakka and Murali Krishna, from Narsaraopet, Guntur District of Andhra Pradesh inaugurated F2S on November 14, 2005, in Hyderabad. The founders are all software engineers employed in various countries. Friends2Support was founded as an effort to tackle the problem of blood unavailability at the hospital.

The five members became the first donors, after which others joined. They had to manage their IT jobs while spreading the idea. They mailed whoever they knew about the website in their spare time, who in turn, spread it to other people. They held gatherings and approached people door-to-door.

F2S has conducted many events to promote their idea across the country including bike rallies, walks and signature campaigns.

Future plans include establishing a free toll-free number across the country in various languages concentrating on rural education and starting a book donation website.

Mobile apps 
F2S has launched mobile apps for all mobile platforms (Android, Windows and iPhone).

Serving the needy across India, friends2support.org has been making the free database of voluntary donors' contact information available 24X7 on all possible platforms leveraging the emerging technologies. They have launched the GPS (Global Positioning System) based 'search for donor' in all these countries on its mobile applications 'Apps' on iOS, Android and Windows phones. People wishing to register themselves as donors can do so from the Apps.

The website and mobile apps allow you to either register or call voluntary blood donors without third-party human interference and allow users to track their donation records.

Achievements 
Digital Trailblazer award
Award of Excellence 2015 from the Ministry of Health of India, June 14, 2015
United Nations World Summit Youth Award
Heroes of Hyderabad Award to founder Shareef from Radio City 91.1 FM
Real Hero Award to founder Shareef
Listed In The Limca Book Of Records For Maintaining The Largest Database Of Voluntary Blood Donors.
World Summit Youth Award (WSYA) recognized F2S as Top 5 Runner-Up for the contribution towards using Internet and Mobiles to get Action on United Nations Millennium Development goals under the category Fight Hunger, Poverty & Disease.
NASSCOM Foundation Social Innovation Honours shortlisted F2S  for the innovative contribution to society (non-profit).
Manthan Award 2007 was conferred during an International Conference on e-content and Sustainability event organised by the Digital Empowerment Foundation in association with the Department of Information Technology and American India Foundation in New Delhi on September 21 and 22.

Notes

References 

 
 
 
 
 

Non-profit organisations based in India